The British Open is the Open Championship men's golf tournament.

British Open may also refer to:
 British Open (ballroom), the dancing competitions of the Blackpool Dance Festival
 BDO British Open, a darts tournament
 Women's British Open of golf
 British Open Show Jumping Championships
 British Open (snooker), an annual tournament which was originally run from 1980 until 2004 before it was revived in 2021.
 British Open Squash Championships
 British Open (tennis) or Wimbledon Championships (informally known as The Championships, Wimbledon)
 British Open Wheelchair Championships, a wheelchair tennis tournament that Nimrod Bichler has coached some participants of